The Lee Woy & Company Building is an historic building in Victoria, British Columbia, Canada.

See also
 List of historic places in Victoria, British Columbia

References

External links
 

Buildings and structures in Victoria, British Columbia